In American college football, the 2007 BCS computer rankings are a part of the Bowl Championship Series (BCS) formula that determines who plays in the BCS National Championship Game as well as several other bowl games. Each computer system was developed using different methods which attempts to rank the teams' performance. For 2007, the highest and lowest rankings for a team are dropped and the remaining four rankings are summed. A team ranked #1 by a computer system is given 25 points, #2 is given 24 points and so forth. The summed values are then divided by 100 (the maximum value a team can earn if they received four first place votes that were summed). The values are then ranked by percentage. This percentage ranking is then averaged with the Coaches Poll and Harris Poll average rankings, each receiving equal weight, and the results become the BCS Rankings.

BCS computer rankings average
For 2007, the rankings released beginning with the eighth week of the season on October 13. The rankings are updated each week until the end of the season. Data taken from official BCS website. There are missing values in the table because the BCS Rankings only list the top 25 of the BCS Rankings, providing data on how those teams achieved their top 25 ranking. The computers ranking may include teams that do not make the top 25 BCS Rankings once averaged with the AP and Coaches Polls.

Anderson & Hester
Jeff Anderson and Chris Hester are the owners of this computer system that has been a part of the BCS since its inception. The Anderson & Hester Rankings claim to be distinct in four ways:
These rankings do not reward teams for running up scores.  Teams are rewarded for beating quality opponents, which is the object of the game.  Margin of victory, which is not the object of the game, is not considered. 
Unlike the AP and Coaches Polls, these rankings do not prejudge teams.  These rankings first appear after the season's fifth week, and each team's ranking reflects its actual accomplishments on the field, not its perceived potential. 
These rankings compute the most accurate strength of schedule ratings.  Each team's opponents and opponents' opponents are judged not only by their won-lost records but also, uniquely, by their conferences' strength (see #4). 
These rankings provide the most accurate conference ratings.  Each conference is rated according to its non-conference won-lost record and the difficulty of its non-conference schedule.

The BCS once allowed computer rankings to consider margin of victory, but that was removed following the 2004 season. Therefore, all six computer systems currently do not include margin of victory. However, this computer system has never included it in its formula. In addition, only human polls (specifically the AP Poll and Coaches Poll in this reference) "prejudge" teams by releasing pre-season polls with the expected rankings of teams before they have played any games. The last two claims are subjective opinions by the authors of this computer system.

Billingsley
Richard Billingsley owns this computer system. He describes himself as not a mathematician or computer-geek; simply a devout college football fan since the age of 7. The main components in the formula are: Won-Loss Records, Opponent Strength (based on the opponent’s record, rating, and rank), with a strong emphasis on the most recent performance. Very minor consideration is also given to the site of the game, and defensive scoring performance.

Billingsley did use margin of victory, but removed it after the 2001 season. It had accounted for 5% of the total ranking for his system and was part of it for 32 years. Also, this computer system releases rankings each week, using a complex formula to incorporate the previous season's rank (but not ranking score) into the early parts of the current season.

Colley Matrix
Wes Colley has a Ph.D from Princeton University in Astrophysical Sciences.  He attended Virginia and is therefore a Virginia fan. His brother, Will Colley played for Georgia. Colley claims 5 advantages using his system:
 First and foremost, the rankings are based only on results from the field, with absolutely no influence from opinion, past performance, tradition or any other bias factor. This is why there is no pre-season poll here. All teams are assumed equal at the beginning of each year.
 Second, strength of schedule has a strong influence on the final ranking. A team does not gain by padding its schedule, so those wins against James Madison or William & Mary are discounted.  (Prior to 2007, these games were completely ignored.  With the schedule expansion to 12 games, these are now counted but still influence the scores very little since their strength of schedule makes them very weak teams.) For example, Wisconsin with 4 losses finished the 2000 season well ahead of TCU with only 2 losses. That's because Wisconsin's Big 10 schedule was much, much more difficult that TCU's WAC schedule.
 Third, as with the NFL, NHL, NBA, and Major League, score margin does not matter at all in determining ranking, so a large victory margin may influence pollsters, but does not influence this scheme. This reflects Colley's view that the object of football is winning the game, not winning by a large margin.
 Fourth, there is no ad hoc weighting of opponents' winning percentage and opponents' opponents' winning percentage, etc., ad infinitum (no random choices of 1/3 of this + 2/3 of that, for example). In this method, very simple statistical principles, with absolutely no fine tuning are used to construct a system of 117 equations with 117 variables, representing each team according only to its wins and losses, (see Ranking Method). The computer simply solves those equations to arrive at a rating (and ranking) for each team.
 Fifth, comparison between this scheme and the final press polls (1998, 1999, 2000, 2001, 2002) proves that the scheme produces sensible results.

While all computer systems are not biased towards the "Name recognition" of a school, Colley's system doesn't include any information that doesn't involve the current season. No pre-season poll and no carry-over from the previous season.

Massey
Kenneth Massey is the owner of this complex computer system. He was a Ph.D candidate of Mathematics at Virginia Tech. Only the score, venue, and date of each game are used to calculate the Massey ratings. However, Massey calculates an offensive and defensive ratings which combine to produce a power ranking as well. The overall team rating is a merit based quantity, and is the result of applying a Bayesian win-loss correction to the power rating.

Sagarin
Jeff Sagarin owns this computer system that is published in USA Today. He holds an MBA from Indiana. This system uses the Elo Chess system where winning and losing are the sole factors. He also publishes a "Predictor" system that uses margin of victory. However, the BCS only uses the Elo Chess system.

Wolfe
Peter Wolfe uses a Bradley-Terry model for his computer system. It uses wins and losses but also uses game location as a factor. In addition, he ranks all teams that can be connected by schedule played (over 700 involving Division I FBS, Division I FCS, II, III and NAIA).

Legend

See also

 2006 BCS computer rankings

References

Bowl Championship Series